Myrmecocephalus concinnus is a species of rove beetle in the family Staphylinidae. It is found in Africa, North America, Oceania, South America, Southern Asia, and Europe.

References

Further reading

 

Aleocharinae
Articles created by Qbugbot
Beetles described in 1840